Riederwaldstadion is a stadium in Seckbach district of Frankfurt am Main in Germany. It was home pitch for Eintracht Frankfurt U23 until 2008, when Eintracht Frankfurt U23 moved.

The stadium was destroyed during World War II in 1943 and was rebuilt in 1952.

References

Eintracht Frankfurt
Buildings and structures in Frankfurt
Football venues in Frankfurt
1920 establishments in Germany
Sports venues completed in 1920